Zoey's Extraordinary Playlist is an American musical comedy-drama television series created by Austin Winsberg that premiered on January 7, 2020, on NBC. The series stars Jane Levy as Zoey Clarke, a software developer who discovers she has the ability to hear the innermost thoughts of people as songs. Each episode features multiple song-and-dance numbers that develop the storyline, with each cast member singing their own character's songs. The series also stars Skylar Astin, Alex Newell, John Clarence Stewart, Peter Gallagher, Mary Steenburgen, Lauren Graham, Andrew Leeds, Alice Lee, Michael Thomas Grant and Kapil Talwalkar, and Bernadette Peters. In June 2020, the series was renewed for a second season which premiered on January 5, 2021. In June 2021, the series was canceled by NBC after two seasons.

In September 2021, it was announced that streaming service The Roku Channel officially commissioned a two-hour holiday film, which if successful, could lead to more episodes. The film was released on December 1, 2021. In addition to songs performed on Zoey's Extraordinary Christmas, a second original song for this series was composed — "North Star", written by Mary Steenburgen, Caitlyn Smith and Troy Verges and sung by Tori Kelly, and played during the end credit sequence.

Cast

Main

 Jane Levy as Zoey Clarke, a programmer who has been recently promoted to engineering manager at San Francisco–based SPRQ Point, a tech firm specializing in smart devices and apps. An earthquake occurs while she is getting an MRI, and a huge playlist of songs on file is downloaded into her brain; she subsequently discovers her mind can now perceive the innermost thoughts of others in the form of popular songs and dance, which she refers to as "heart songs".
 Skylar Astin as Max Richman, Zoey's coworker at SPRQ Point and her closest friend, who has romantic feelings for her. They later become a couple and he inherits her power to hear "heart songs". 
 Alex Newell as Mo, Zoey's genderfluid neighbor and a DJ, who tries to help her understand the extent of her power. Mo later cooperates with Max to start their own business, a restaurant called "MaxiMo's" which only serves food ordered at other restaurants. 
 John Clarence Stewart as Simon, a new employee at SPRQ Point who bonds with Zoey over their shared tragic experiences
 Peter Gallagher as Mitch Clarke (season 1 and film, special guest star season 2), Zoey's father. He has progressive supranuclear palsy, which causes him to lose muscular faculties (based in part on Winsberg's experiences with his own father). Mitch is unable to speak, but he can type short phrases on a computer. Zoey's new gift provides a temporary voice for him to sing out what he's really thinking.
 Mary Steenburgen as Maggie Clarke, Zoey's mother and Mitch's wife. She and Mitch ran a landscape design business prior to his diagnosis.
 Lauren Graham as Joan (season 1, special guest season 2), Zoey's boss at SPRQ Point. She leaves for Singapore and promotes Zoey to her position in the second season.
 Andrew Leeds as David Clarke (season 2 and film; recurring season 1), Zoey's older brother and a public defender
 Alice Lee as Emily Kang (season 2 and film; recurring season 1), David's wife who is pregnant with their child and is a corporate lawyer
 Michael Thomas Grant as Leif (season 2 and film; recurring season 1), a coder and professional rival of Zoey, who is part of her engineering team
 Kapil Talwalkar as Tobin (season 2 and film;  recurring season 1), a coder at SPRQ Point and Leif's best friend, who is also part of Zoey's team

Recurring
 
 Stephanie Styles as Autumn (season 1), a barista who briefly dates Max as a result of Zoey's suggestion
 India de Beaufort as Jessica (season 1), Simon's fiancée
 Noah Weisberg as Danny Michael Davis, a mercurial tech billionaire and the founder and CEO of SPRQ Point
 Patrick Ortiz as Eddie (season 1), Mo's new boyfriend and a friend of Jessica
 Zak Orth as Howie (season 1), Mitch's home health aide
 Hiro Kanagawa as Dr. Hamara (season 1), who treats Mitch for his PSP
 Bernadette Peters as Deb, a recently widowed woman who Zoey meets at the funeral home. She later befriends Maggie.
 Harvey Guillén as George (season 2), a new programmer at SPRQ Point
 Jee Young Han as Jenna Kang (season 2), Emily's older sister
 Morgan Taylor Campbell as McKenzie (season 2 and film), a coder at SPRQ Point who is moved into Zoey's team
 Alvina August as Tatiana Morris (season 2), a reporter who befriends Simon
 Felix Mallard as Aiden (season 2), Zoey's neighbor and childhood friend
 Katie Findlay as Rose (season 2), a childhood friend of Max's from camp
 David St. Louis as Perry (season 2 and film), a fire marshal and love interest for Mo

Guest
 Justin Kirk as Charlie, Joan's high-profile and demanding husband (in "Zoey's Extraordinary Boss")
 Renée Elise Goldsberry as Ava Price, Joan's business rival and ambitious manager on the sixth floor of SPRQ Point (in "Zoey's Extraordinary Silence", "Zoey's Extraordinary Outburst", and "Zoey's Extraordinary Mother")
 Sandra Mae Frank as Abigail, Howie's daughter and an aspiring coder (in "Zoey's Extraordinary Silence"). She is deaf, and Zoey observes her heart-song performed in American Sign Language.
 Chip Zien as Alan, Max's father, a dentist who wants Max to return to New York and join the family business (in "Zoey's Extraordinary Trip")
 Ashlie Atkinson as Nova, a medium Zoey visits (in "Zoey's Extraordinary Mystery")
 Rocco Morris as August, Perry's son (in "Zoey's Extraordinary Mystery", "Zoey's Extraordinary Girls' Night" and film) 
 Amarah Taylor as Amirah, Perry's daughter (in "Zoey's Extraordinary Mystery", "Zoey's Extraordinary Girls' Night", "Zoey's Extraordinary Goodbye" and film)
 Oscar Nunez as Dr. Tesoro, Zoey's therapist (in "Zoey's Extraordinary Girls' Night", "Zoey's Extraordinary Double Date", and "Zoey's Extraordinary Session")
 David James Elliott as Jack, the owner of a Christmas tree lot, who attracts Maggie's interest (in "Zoey's Extraordinary Christmas")

Episodes

Series overview

Season 1 (2020)

Season 2 (2021)

Film (2021)

Production

Development
On January 12, 2019, the production officially received a pilot order. The pilot was written by Austin Winsberg who executive produces alongside Richard Shepard, Paul Feig, Kim Tannenbaum, Eric Tannenbaum, David Blackman and Daniel Inkeles. Production companies involved with the pilot include Lionsgate Television and Universal Television. On May 12, 2019, it was announced that the production had been given a series order. A few days later, it was announced that the series would premiere as a mid-season replacement in the mid-season of 2020. The series premiered as a special preview on January 7, and moved to its regular time-slot on February 16, 2020. On June 11, 2020, NBC renewed the series for a second season, following significant gains among digital viewership and strong fan support in USA Today's annual Save Our Shows poll. The second season premiered on January 5, 2021. On June 9, 2021, NBC canceled the series after two seasons, but was expected to shop to other networks. On August 5, 2021, it was announced that streaming service The Roku Channel was nearing a deal for a two-hour wrap-up movie, with potential of leading to more episodes. TVLine reported on September 8, 2021, that the movie — Zoey's Extraordinary Christmas — was scheduled to begin production in Vancouver within the month. An excerpt of the movie was posted to YouTube on November 1, 2021, promoting a full release of the movie on December 1, 2021.

Casting
In February 2019, it was announced that Jane Levy, Skylar Astin, Alex Newell and Mary Steenburgen had been cast in the pilot's leading roles. The pilot was ordered. In March 2019 it was reported that Peter Gallagher, John Clarence Stewart and Carmen Cusack had joined the cast. On May 23, 2019, Andrew Leeds was cast as David in a recurring role. On August 27, 2019, it was announced that Lauren Graham had replaced Cusack in the role of Joan. On September 6, 2019, Michael Thomas Grant, Kapil Talwalkar and Stephanie Styles were cast in recurring capacities. In September 2020, it was announced that Kapil Talwalkar, Andrew Leeds, Alice Lee, and Michael Thomas Grant had been promoted to series regulars while Harvey Guillén was cast in a recurring role for the second season. On October 29, 2020, Jee Young Han and Felix Mallard were cast in recurring roles for the second season.

Graham's character was written out in the second season as moving to Singapore, since Graham was busy filming The Mighty Ducks: Game Changers. On March 18, 2021, Katie Findlay joined the cast in a recurring role for the second season.

Filming
Principal photography for the first season began on September 3, 2019, and ended on January 30, 2020, in Richmond, British Columbia. The closing credits note that the pilot was partially filmed in San Francisco, with a number of open air musical productions shot on the downtown streets of The Embarcadero and North Beach. Mandy Moore serves as a producer and the choreographer for the series. Filming for the second season began on September 21, 2020, and concluded on March 26, 2021. Filming for Zoey's Extraordinary Christmas ran from September 15, 2021, to October 8, 2021.

Broadcast
Zoey's Extraordinary Playlist premiered on Tuesday, January 7, 2020, in the 10:00 p.m. (EDT) hour. The series returned on Sunday, February 16, 2020, at 9:00 p.m. and maintained that timeslot for the remainder of the first season. The second season premiered on Tuesday, January 5, 2021, at 8:00 p.m. EDT. Zoey's Extraordinary Playlist went on hiatus on February 9, 2021, and was replaced by Young Rock and Kenan. The series returned to its original timeslot on Sunday, March 28, 2021.

In the United Kingdom, the series was picked up by Channel 4 for broadcast on their E4 channel, though after a few episodes of season 2 the show was moved, at short notice, out of primetime to around 2:00am, being replaced by a repeat of Naked Attraction. In addition to E4, Channel 4 have also re-run season 1 on their 4Music channel.

In Australia, the series premiered on streaming service Stan on February 17, 2020 with each episode being released the week after its US premiere.

List of songs performed on the show
This is a list of songs that have been performed on the show. The series features "musical performances that explore the innermost feelings of its characters" as they "break out into song and (sometimes) dance". Mae Abdulbaki of Cinemablend, said the show "cleverly tackles pent-up emotions and storylines through song".

Season 1

Season 2

Film

Reception

Critical response
The review aggregator website Rotten Tomatoes reported a 76% approval rating with an average rating of 7.18/10, based on 34 reviews for the first season. The website's critical consensus states, "Though it hits the occasional sour note, Zoey's Extraordinary Playlist manages to carry a pretty enjoyable tune, thanks in large part to the always charming Jane Levy." On Metacritic, it has a weighted average score of 66 out of 100, based on 18 critics, indicating "generally favorable reviews". Mae Abdulbaki of CinemaBlend, said the show "cleverly tackles pent-up emotions and storylines through song".

On Rotten Tomatoes, the second season has an approval rating of 83% based on 6 critic reviews, with an average rating of 8.37/10.

Ratings

Season 1

Season 2

Accolades

See also
 Jukebox musical

Notes

References

External links
 
 

2020 American television series debuts
2021 American television series endings
2020s American musical comedy television series
English-language television shows
Jukebox musicals
NBC original programming
Television series by Lionsgate Television
Television series by Universal Television
Television shows filmed in British Columbia
Television shows set in San Francisco